XHEPX-FM is a radio station on 99.9 FM in El Vigía, Oaxaca, serving Puerto Ángel. It is known as La Voz del Ángel.

History
XEPX-AM 1340 received its concession on November 26, 1977. It was owned by Julio Jalil Tame and broadcast with 500 watts. By 1997, XEPX had moved to 650 kHz with 5,000 watts, and in 2011, it was authorized to move to FM.

References

Radio stations in Oaxaca
Radio stations in Mexico with continuity obligations